The 1992 United States presidential election in Illinois took place on November 3, 1992, as part of the 1992 United States presidential election. Voters chose 22 representatives, or electors to the Electoral College, who voted for president and vice president.

Illinois was won by Governor Bill Clinton (D-Arkansas) with 48.58% of the popular vote over incumbent President George H. W. Bush (R-Texas) with 34.34%. Businessman Ross Perot (I-Texas) finished in third, with 16.64% of the popular vote. In 1988, Dukakis also received 48.6% of the vote.

Clinton ultimately won the national vote, defeating incumbent President Bush. Clinton became the first Democrat to win Illinois on a presidential level since 1964 and notably won seven of 21 Illinois counties that had backed Barry Goldwater in that election. He remains the only Democrat to win Johnson County and Pope County — Southern and anti-Yankee in culture but converted to Unionism by war — since Stephen A. Douglas in 1860. In Northern Illinois Clinton became the first Democrat to ever win Whiteside County which had voted in Presidential elections since 1840, the first to win DeKalb County since Franklin Pierce in 1852, and the first to win Bureau, McDonough and Warren Counties since Franklin D. Roosevelt in 1932.

This represented a realigning election for Illinois in regards to presidential politics. The first time that Illinois voted for the Democratic ticket in a presidential election since 1964, this ended a streak of six consecutive elections in which the state had voted for the Republican ticket. It also began a streak that, as of the 2020 election, continues, in which the state has voted by double digits for the Democratic ticket in eight consecutive presidential elections.

As of the 2020 presidential election, this is also the last election in which the following counties voted for a Democratic presidential candidate: Brown, Clark, Crawford, Cumberland, Douglas, Edgar, Jasper, Monroe, Richland, and Tazewell.

Election information
The primaries and general elections coincided with those for other federal elections (Senate and House), as well as those for state offices.

Turnout
For the state-run primaries (Democratic and Republican), turnout was 39.82%, with 2,335,270 votes cast. For the general election, turnout was 76.51%, with 5,050,157 votes cast.

Primaries
State-run primaries were held for the Democratic, Republican, parties on March 17.

Democratic

The 1992 Illinois Democratic presidential primary was held on March 17, 1992 in the U.S. state of Illinois as one of the Democratic Party's statewide nomination contests ahead of the 1992 presidential election.

Republican

The 1992 Illinois Republican presidential primary was held on March 17, 1992 in the U.S. state of Illinois as one of the Republican Party's statewide nomination contests ahead of the 1992 presidential election.

Incumbent president George H. W. Bush won the primary by a large margin.

General election

Results by county

By congressional district

See also
 1992 Illinois elections
 Presidency of Bill Clinton
 United States presidential elections in Illinois

Notes

References

Illinois
1992
1992 Illinois elections